Libor Barta (born 30 July 1967) is a former Czech professional ice hockey player. 

Formerly played with HC Slovan Bratislava, HC Pardubice, VTJ Litoměřice, HC Stadion Hradec Králové, HC Kometa Brno BVV, HC Berounští Medvědí, HC Keramika Plzeň, HC Energie Karlovy Vary, HC Chrudim, TJ Sršni Kutná Hora and HC Dvůr Králové nad Labem.

References

Living people
HC Berounští Medvědi players
HC Chrudim players
HC Dynamo Pardubice players
HC Kometa Brno players
HC Plzeň players
HC Slovan Bratislava players
Stadion Hradec Králové players
Czech ice hockey goaltenders
1967 births
Czech expatriate ice hockey players in Slovakia
Sportspeople from Pardubice
Czechoslovak ice hockey goaltenders